Jack Oyugi is an entrepreneur from Kenya known for developing animal feed.

References

Kenyan businesspeople
Living people
Year of birth missing (living people)